2018 Indoor Hockey World Cup may refer to:

2018 Men's Indoor Hockey World Cup
2018 Women's Indoor Hockey World Cup